The Pedra do Elefante Natural Monument is a municipal Natural monument in the state of Rio de Janeiro, Brazil.

Location

The Pedra do Elefante Natural Monument is in the municipality of Petrópolis, Rio de Janeiro.
The monument is an imposing granite mountain in the Serra de Petrópolis.
It is in the Posse district of the Taquaril Bairro.
It is located on the Taquaril road.

It provides challenging routes for climbers, who may reach the base via well maintained trails from the Abrigo do Elefante site at Kilometer 2 on the Taquaril road.
Hazards include loose stones, hawks, swallows, snakes, racoons and, according to legend, an ocelot.
The site in 2013 was suffering from deforestation and use of pesticides by local landowners.

History

The Pedra do Elefante Natural Monument was created by municipal decree in May 2010.
The board was to consist of ten government representatives and ten representatives of civil society.
It is classed as a fully protected conservation unit.
It is administered by the municipal Secretariat of Environment and Sustainable Development.
It was included in the Central Rio de Janeiro Atlantic Forest Mosaic, which had been created in December 2006.

In 2011 it was proposed to develop a master plan for the municipality of Petrópolis for adaptation to climate change.
The civil society members of the board were elected in 2013 as a step towards creating a management plan, required in order to get federal funding.

Notes

Sources

Natural monuments of Brazil
Protected areas of Rio de Janeiro (state)
2010 establishments in Brazil